The 2nd Utah State Legislature was elected Tuesday, November 3, 1896, and convened on Monday, January 11, 1897.

Dates of sessions

 1897 Biennial Session: January 11, 1897

Leadership

Utah Senate

 President of the Senate: Aquila Nebeker

Utah House of Representatives

 Speaker of the House: John N. Perkins

Utah Senate

Make-up

Members

Utah House of Representatives

Make-up

Members

See also
 List of Utah state legislatures

References

Legislature
2
1896 in Utah
1897 in Utah